Leucostomatini is a tribe of flies in the family Tachinidae, found worldwide.

Genera
These 21 genera belong to the tribe Leucostomatini:

 Apomorphomyia Crosskey, 1984
 Brullaea Robineau-Desvoidy, 1863
 Cahenia Verbeke, 1960
 Calyptromyia Villeneuve, 1915
 Cinochira Zetterstedt, 1845
 Clairvillia Robineau-Desvoidy, 1830
 Clairvilliops Mesnil, 1959
 Clelimyia Herting, 1981
 Dionaea Robineau-Desvoidy, 1830
 Dionomelia Kugler, 1978
 Eulabidogaster Belanovsky, 1951
 Labigastera Macquart, 1834
 Leucostoma Meigen, 1803
 Oblitoneura Mesnil, 1975
 Pradocania Tschorsnig, 1997
 Psalidoxena Villeneuve, 1941
 Pseudobrullaea Mesnil, 1957
 Takanoella Baranov, 1935
 Truphia Malloch, 1930
 Vanderwulpella Townsend, 1919
 Weberia Robineau-Desvoidy, 1830

References

Brachyceran flies of Europe
Brachycera tribes
Phasiinae